Photedes panatela, the northern cordgrass borer, is a species of cutworm or dart moth in the family Noctuidae.

The MONA or Hodges number for Photedes panatela is 9436.

References

Further reading

 
 
 

Noctuinae
Articles created by Qbugbot
Moths described in 1904